Zara Pasfield (born 28 June 1995) is a retired Australian figure skater. She is the 2011 NZ Winter Games bronze medalist and the 2012 Australian national champion.

On the junior level, she is a two-time Australian junior national bronze medalist (2009, 2011).

Personal life
Pasfield is the daughter of Michael Pasfield, a former competitive figure skater, and sister of Katie Pasfield, a two-time Australian ladies' bronze medallist (2017, 2018).

Pasfield graduated from Pymble Ladies' College in 2013 and from the University of Technology Sydney in 2017 with a degree in spatial and interior architecture.

Competitive highlights

References

Australian female single skaters
1995 births
Living people
Figure skaters from Sydney
University of Technology Sydney alumni
People educated at Pymble Ladies' College